Mayanja Memorial Hospital (MMH), is a private, not-for-profit hospital in Mbarara, the largest city in the Western Region of Uganda.

Location
The geographical coordinates of Mayanja Memorial Hospital are: 0°36'57.0"S, 30°39'41.0"E (Latitude:-0.615833; Longitude:30.661389).

Overview
MMH is an urban, private, not-for-profit, community hospital that serves the population of Mbarara and surrounding districts. The hospital aims to address the gap in healthcare delivery in the country and to serve that segment of Uganda's population that has been seeking the missing services from outside Uganda. The hospital is owned and operated by Mayanja Memorial Hospital Foundation, a Ugandan Non-governmental organization. The affairs of the hospital are directed by a Board of Directors.

History
MMH is named after the late Martin Luther Mayanja, the father of the founder-proprietor, Dr Benon Mugerwa. The first phase of the hospital, with 100-bed capacity,  was completed in November 2003 and cost USh5 billion (approx. US$2 million in 2003 money).

See also
Hospitals in Uganda

References

External links
 Museveni wants lower interest rate As of 9 uust 2007.

Hospital buildings completed in 2003
Hospitals in Uganda
2003 establishments in Uganda
Hospitals established in 2003